El 5 de Talleres, also known as El Cinco (English: The 5), is a 2014 drama film written and directed by Adrián Biniez, about an Argentine footballer in the Talleres de Remedios de Escalada club who contemplates an alternate career after receiving an unjust suspension. The film is a co-production between Argentina, Uruguay, France, Germany and the Netherlands.

References

External links

2014 films
Argentine association football films
2010s sports drama films
2014 drama films
2010s Argentine films